Bobby Dale Lee (August 26, 1945-April 25, 2009) is a former American football wide receiver who played for the St. Louis Cardinals and Atlanta Falcons of the National Football League (NFL). He played college football at the University of Minnesota.

References 

1945 births
2009 deaths
American football wide receivers
Minnesota Golden Gophers football players
St. Louis Cardinals (football) players